= Elevon, Virginia =

Unincorporated community in Virginia, United States

Coordinates: 37°59′38″N 77°04′23″W

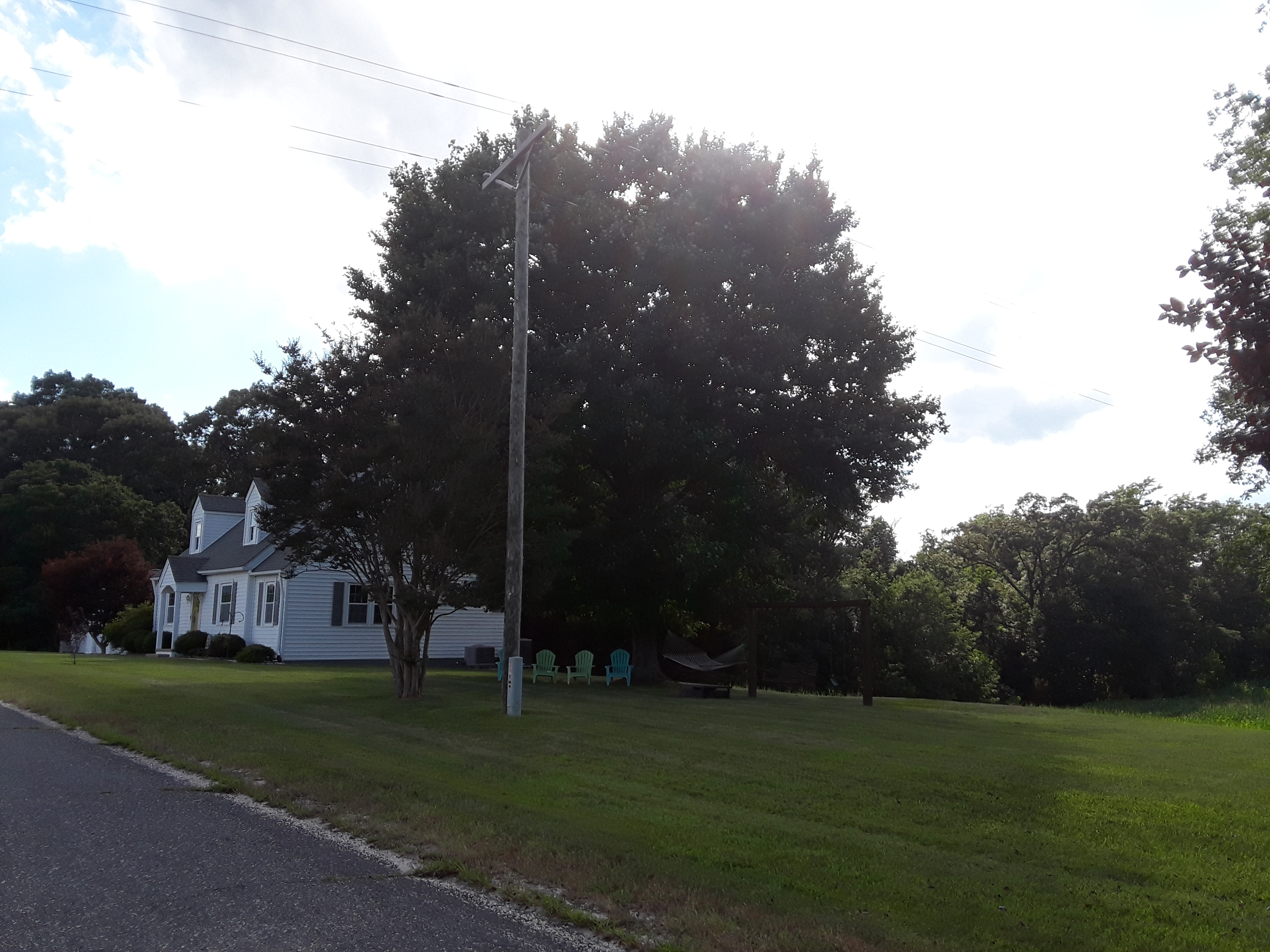
House in Elevon, July 2018

Elevon is an unincorporated community in Caroline County, in the U.S. state of Virginia.
